Langridge is a surname. Notable people with the surname include:

 Albert Kent Langridge, known as A. K. Langridge (late 19th – early 20th centuries), English author, wrote about missions to South Seas islands
 Chris Langridge (born 1985), English badminton player
 George Langridge (1829–1891), politician in Victoria, Australia
 James Langridge (1906–1966), English cricketer
 John Langridge (1910–1999), English cricketer
 Matt Langridge (born 1983), English oarsman
 Philip Langridge (1939–2010), English operatic tenor
 Richard Langridge (1939–2005), English cricketer
 Roger Langridge (born 1967), New Zealand-born comics writer and artist
 Stuart Langridge (born 1976), English software designer
 Ted Langridge (born 1936), Australian rules footballer

See also 
 Charlcombe, a civil parish in Somerset including the village of Landgridge
 Langridge, a ward of the City of Yarra, Victoria, Australia
 Langrage, a type of Naval artillery in the Age of Sail